Charles Joseph Ebert (April 30, 1885 - June 29, 1983) was a member of the Wisconsin State Assembly.

Biography
Ebert was born on April 30, 1885 in Seymour, Wisconsin. He became a bank director, cheese maker and operator of a cold storage plant.

Political career
Ebert was first elected to the Assembly in 1940. Additionally, he was President of Gresham, Wisconsin and a member of the Shawano County, Wisconsin Board. He was a Republican.

References

People from Seymour, Wisconsin
People from Shawano County, Wisconsin
Mayors of places in Wisconsin
County supervisors in Wisconsin
Republican Party members of the Wisconsin State Assembly
1885 births
1983 deaths